Juǀʼhoan, also known as Southern or Southeastern ǃKung or ǃXun, is the southern variety of the ǃKung dialect continuum, spoken in northeastern Namibia and the Northwest District of Botswana by San Bushmen who largely identify themselves as Juǀʼhoansi. Several regional dialects are distinguished: Epukiro, Tsumǃkwe, Rundu, Omatako and ǂKxʼauǁʼein, with Tsumǃkwe being the best described and often taken as representative.

Name
The name Juǀʼhoan (in the plural: Juǀʼhoansi) is also rendered Žuǀʼhõa – or occasionally Zhuǀʼhõa or Dzuǀʼhõa, depending on orthography. Depending on the classification, it is considered the Southern or Southeastern variety of the ǃKung (also rendered ǃXun) language cluster. It may thus be referred to as Southern ǃKung, Southeastern ǃXun, etc. Juǀʼhoan is based on the word  'people', which is also applied to the language cluster. (see ǃKung languages for variants of those names).

Phonology

Vowels 

 When a front vowel /e/ or /i/ follows a consonant with a back vowel constraint (e.g. clicks with uvular articulation), an [ə] is inserted before the front vowel, written 'a' in the orthography. For example, mi |'ae (myself) reads /mi |'əe/.
 The diphthong /oa/ may be realized as [wa].

Juǀʼhoan has five vowel qualities, which may be nasalized, glottalized, murmured, or combinations of these, and most of these possibilities occur both long and short. The qualities  and  may also be pharyngealized and strident (epiglottalized). Besides, it is a tonal language with four tones: very high, high, low and very low tones. Thus, there are a good 30 vowel phonemes, perhaps more, depending on one's analysis. There are, in addition, many vowel sequences and diphthongs.

Consonants 
Juǀʼhoan has an unusually large number of consonants, as typical for ǃKung. The following occur at the beginnings of roots. For brevity, only the alveolar clicks are listed with the other consonants; the complete set of clicks is found below.

Tenuis and modally voiced consonants (blue) may occur with any vowel quality. However, other consonants (grey, transcribed with a superscript diacritic to their right) do not occur in the same root as murmured, glottalized, or epiglottalized vowels.

The prevoiced aspirated and ejective consonants, both pulmonic and clicks, contain a voiceless interval, which Miller (2003) attributes to a larger glottal opening than is found in Hindustani breathy-voiced consonants. Phonetically, however, they are voice contours, starting out voiced but becoming voiceless for the aspiration or ejection.

Labials are very rare initially, though  is common between vowels. Velar stops (oral and nasal) are rare initially and very rare medially.

The uvulo-ejective consonants are analyzed as epiglottalized in Miller-Ockhuizen (2003). They have uvular frication and glottalization, and are similar to consonants in Nǀu described as uvular ejective by Miller et al. (2009). Their epiglottal character may be a phonetic consequence of the raised larynx involved in making them ejective.

Only a small set of consonants occur between vowels within roots. These are:

However,  especially may correspond to multiple root-initial consonants.

Juǀʼhoan has 48 click consonants. There are four click "types": dental, lateral, alveolar, and palatal, each of which found in twelve series or "accompaniments" (combinations of manner, phonation, and contour). These are perfectly normal consonants in Juǀʼhoan, and indeed are preferred over non-clicks in word-initial position.

As above, tenuis and modally voiced consonants (blue) may occur with any vowel quality. However, other consonants (grey, transcribed with a superscript diacritic to their right) do not occur in the same root as murmured, glottalized, or epiglottalized vowels.

Glottalized clicks occur almost exclusively before nasal vowels. This suggests they are nasalized, as in most if not all other languages with glottalized clicks. The nasalization would not be audible during the click itself due to the glottalization, which would prevent any nasal airflow, but the velum would be lowered, potentially nasalizing adjacent vowels.

The 'uvularized' clicks are actually linguo-pulmonic contours, etc. The 'uvulo-ejective' clicks are heterorganic affricates, and equivalent to linguo-glottalic consonants transcribed , etc., in other languages (Miller 2011).

See Ekoka ǃXung for a related variety with a somewhat larger click inventory.

Orthographic history
Juǀʼhoan is the only variety of ǃKung to be written. Three orthographies have been used over the past half century, two based on pipe letters for clicks and one using only the basic Latin alphabet.

In the 1960s, the South African Department of Education set about establishing official orthographies for the languages of Southwest Africa (Namibia). Jan Snyman was selected to develop an orthography for the then-unwritten Juǀʼhoasi, which was accepted in 1969. In this orthography, the name of the language is spelled Žuǀʼhõasi. A slightly modified form (Snyman 1975) is shown below.

In the 1980s, the Bible Society of South Africa requested a new orthography, one that used only letters of the Latin alphabet, avoided diacritics as much as possible, and conformed as much as possible to the conventions of Afrikaans. This second orthography was accepted in 1987, in which the language is spelled Zjuc'hôa.

A third orthography was developed by the Juǀwa Bushman Development Foundation in 1994. This is the orthography that is currently in use in Namibia; there does not seem to be any publication in Botswana.

The three orthographies, along with the IPA, are compared below. Tone is evidently unmarked.

The modern (1994) orthography also has ih, eh, ah, oh, uh for breathy (murmured) vowels, and ihn, ahn, ohn, uhn for breathy nasal vowels. However, Snyman maintains that these are positional variants of low-tone vowels, and not needed in an orthography (at least, not if tone were marked). Glottalized vowels are written with an apostrophe in all three orthographies.

Grammar
Source: Dickens (2009).

Juǀ'hoan is basically isolating, being a zero-marking language in both clauses and noun phrases. The word order is SVO.

Nouns and pronouns
Nouns are grouped into noun classes based on animacy and species, with each class having a pronoun-set.

For example, the noun , "dog", belongs to class 2, and may be referred to with the pronoun , whereas , "forest", belongs to class 5, which has  as its corresponding pronoun.

The noun classes and their pronoun-sets are as follows:

Pronouns
Personal and demonstrative pronouns are:

Common words and phrases
 – Good day
 – Good morning
 – Good evening
 - Good afternoon 
 – How are you?
 – Goodbye
 – person
 – people 
,  – water
 – Bon voyage

Sample texts

Following are some sample texts in the Juǀʼhoan language.

Films
1980 – The Gods Must Be Crazy
1980 – Nǃai, the Story of a ǃKung Woman
2003 – The Journey of Man

Bibliography
Dickens, Patrick J. (2005) A Concise Grammar of Juǀʼhoan With a Juǀʼhoan–English Glossary and a Subject Index, Rüdiger Köppe Verlag: Köln.
Miller-Ockhuizen, Amanda (2003) The phonetics and phonology of gutturals: case study from Juǀʼhoansi. Psychology Press.
Snyman, Jan W. (1975) Zuǀʼhõasi Fonologie en Woordeboek. Cape Town: AA Balkema.
Snyman, Jan W. (1983) 'Zuǀʼhõasi, a Khoisan Dialect of South West Africa/Namibia', in Dihoff, Ivan R. (ed.) Current Approaches to African Linguistics Vol 1, 115–125.
Snyman, Jan W. (1997) 'A preliminary classification of the ǃXũũ and Zuǀʼhõasi Dialects', in Haacke, W.H.G. & Elderkin, E.D. (eds.) Namibian Languages: Reports and Papers. (Namibian African Studies, 4). Köln: Rüdiger Köppe, 21–106.
Snyman, Jan W. (n.d.) An Official Orthography for Žuǀʼhõasi Kokxʼoi. Pretoria.

References

External links
Juǀʼhoan basic lexicon at the Global Lexicostatistical Database

Kx'a languages
Languages of Botswana